Finley Jeffrey, (born 22 July 1969), also known as "Scholar" and "King Scholar", is a Grenadian, Calypsonian, Soca artist and songwriter. He has been crowned King of Grenada Calypso on seven separate occasions since his 1993 debut. He is also a one-time Soca monarch and one-time Groovy Soca monarch.

He was Grenada's representative in the 2006 Carifesta Calypso Monarch Competition, where he achieved fifth place out of a group that included Destroyer, Luta, Sandra, Cro Cro and Sugar Aloes.

King Scholar is one of Grenada's Cultural Ambassadors, as well as an artist. He has written numerous calypso and Soca songs.

Early life
Jeffrey was born in the village of Chantimelle, St Patrick, Grenada, on 22 July 1969 to farmers Rita and Henezie Jeffrey. His father was a Chantwell (lead singer) of the Short knee bands of Chantimelle, which inspired Finley to start singing himself.

Personal life
He lives with his wife Dianne and their three children.

Selected discography 

  Voices (1993)
  Heroes (1996)
  Legacy (1999)
  Defense (2009)
  Belly (1996)
  Weapons (2003)
  Can't sing that (1995) 
  Amnesty (1997)
  Montserrat (1998)
  Briefcase(2004)
  All yu ask (1997)
  Belly (1996)
  Underneath (1997)
  Naked (2012)
  One thumb (2010)
  Mad man (2009)
  Facts (2010)
  Love life (2007)
  Nice woman factory (2007)
  Man gone (2007)
  Hold what (2006)

References

1969 births
Living people
Calypsonians
Grenadian musicians
People from Saint Patrick Parish, Grenada